Crieff (meaning "tree") is a Scottish market town in Perth and Kinross on the A85 road between Perth and Crianlarich, and the A822 between Greenloaning and Aberfeldy. The A822 joins the A823 to Dunfermline. Crieff has become a hub for tourism, famous for whisky and its history of cattle droving. Attractions include the Caithness Glass Visitor Centre and Glenturret Distillery. The nearby Innerpeffray Library (founded about 1680) is Scotland's oldest lending library. St Mary's Chapel beside it dates from 1508. Both are open to the public: the library is run by a charitable trust; the chapel is in the care of Historic Scotland.

History
For a number of centuries Highlanders came south to Crieff to sell their black cattle, whose meat and hides were avidly sought by the growing urban populations in Lowland Scotland and the north of England. The town acted as a gathering point for the Michaelmas cattle sale held during the "October Tryst" each year, when the surrounding fields and hillsides would be black with some 30,000 cattle, some from as far away as Caithness and the Outer Hebrides.

Rob Roy MacGregor and his followers visited Crieff in October 1714: they gathered in Crieff for the October Tryst. They marched to Crieff Town Square and, in front of the gathering crowd, they sang Jacobite songs and drank a good many loyal toasts to their uncrowned King James VIII.

In 1716, 350 Highlanders returning from the Battle of Sheriffmuir burned most of Crieff to the ground. In 1731, James Drummond, 3rd Duke of Perth, laid out the town's central James Square and established a textile industry with a flax factory. In the 1745 rising the Highlanders were itching to fire the town again and were reported as saying "she shoud be a braw toun gin she haed anither sing". But it was saved by the Duke of Perth – a friend and supporter of Prince Charles. In February 1746 the Jacobite army was quartered in and around the town with Prince Charles Edward Stuart holding his final war council in the old Drummond Arms Inn in James Square – located behind the present abandoned hotel building in Hill Street.

By the late 18th century the original hanging tree used by the Earls of Strathearn to discipline people had been replaced by a formal wooden structure in an area called Gallowhaugh – now Gallowhill, at the bottom of Burrell Street. What is now Ford Road was Gallowford Road which led down past the gallows to the crossing point over the River Earn. Sir Walter Scott, visiting Crieff in 1796, saw the gallows as "Gallowsford".

Crieff Town Hall was completed in 1850. In the 19th century, Crieff became a fashionable destination for tourists visiting the Highlands and a country retreat for wealthy businessmen from Edinburgh, Glasgow and beyond. Many such visitors attended the Crieff hydropathic establishment, now the Crieff Hydro, which opened in 1868. 

Crieff was once served by Crieff railway station, which linked the town to Perth, Comrie and Gleneagles. The station was opened in 1856 by the Crieff Junction Railway, but closed in 1964 by British Railways as one of the Beeching cuts.

Fame in verse
Crieff was praised by the poetaster William McGonagall in "Crieff".
"Ye lovers of the picturesque, if ye wish to drown your grief,
Take my advice, and visit the ancient town of Crieff."

Events
Every year the town hosts the Crieff Highland Games, which include music and dancing competitions and feats of strength.

Schools
Morrison's Academy
Ardvreck School
St Dominics RC Primary School
Crieff Primary School – A historic picture of Crieff Primary School, see The Schoolmaster, (1953) black and white, 19 minutes. The schoolmaster is played by Walter Carr and the film is narrated by Gordon Jackson.
Strathearn Community Campus

Places of worship

Crieff Parish Church (Church of Scotland) in Strathearn Terrace, also known as the East Church, is on the site of a medieval building that was demolished and rebuilt in 1786, when a hoard of gold coins from the reign of Robert the Bruce was found within its walls. The church was again rebuilt in 1827.

Crieff West Church (Church of Scotland) was built 1837–1838 on Comrie Road as a chapel of ease to the main parish church. It was converted into the St Ninian's Centre in 1958 and used for over 50 years as a lay training and conference venue until its closure in 2001. The building is now occupied by private flats.

The South Church, now disused, was built in 1881 as a Free Church of Scotland, modelled on the design of Dunblane Cathedral. It later became known as the South UP Church when it merged with the United Presbyterian Church (Scotland) into the United Free Church of Scotland, before becoming part of the established Church of Scotland.

The Scottish Episcopal Church in Perth Road is a small 1990s building which replaced an older church.

The Roman Catholic Church is represented by St Fillan's Chapel in Ford Road, as part of the Diocese of Dunkeld.

Media
Radio Earn broadcasts from Strathearn and Strathallan.

Notable people

Dallas Anderson (1874–1934), actor
Moira Armstrong (born 1930), BAFTA-winning television director.
John Craig (1896–1970), recipient of the Victoria Cross, at school in Crieff
Daniel John Cunningham (1850–1909), anatomist and author
Very Rev John Cunningham (1819–1893) father of the above, Moderator of the General Assembly of the Church of Scotland in 1886, served as minister of Crieff Parish Church.
Jackie Dewar (1923–2011), footballer
Eve Graham (born 1943), former singer with New Seekers, has lived in Crieff since 2004
David Jacks, first commercial producer of Monterey Jack cheese
Denis Lawson (born 1947), actor
Ewan McGregor (born 1971), actor
Alexander Murray (1810–1884), geologist
Neil Paterson (1915–1995), Oscar-winning screenwriter, was a resident of Crieff until his death.
Fiona Pennie (born 1982), Olympic canoeist
William Reid (VC) (1921–2001) recipient of the Victoria Cross, died in Crieff
Brian Stewart (1922–2015), soldier, diplomat and spy
Rory Stewart (born 1973), politician
Sophie Stewart (1908–1977), actor 
Gavin Strang (born 1943), politician
Sheila Stuart (1892–1974), children's writer, died here in 1974
Simon Taylor (born 1979), Scottish international rugby player
D. P. Thomson (1896–1974), evangelist of the Church of Scotland, Warden of the St Ninian's Centre
Thomas Thomson (1773–1852), chemist

References

External links

Crieff Visitor Centre
National Library of Scotland: SCOTTISH SCREEN ARCHIVE (selection of archive films about Crieff)
Explore Crieff Path Network – Perth and Kinross Countryside Trust

 
Highland Boundary Fault